Jean-Paul Gahimbaré (born 22 December 1970) is a Burundian athlete who specialized in the marathon and long-distance running

Gahimbaré competed at the 2004 Summer Olympics in Athens when he entered the marathon, but he didn't finish the race.

References

1970 births
Living people
Burundian male long-distance runners
Athletes (track and field) at the 2004 Summer Olympics
Olympic athletes of Burundi
Burundian male marathon runners
20th-century Burundian people
21st-century Burundian people